Crkvice is a village in the municipality of Bojnik, Serbia. According to the 2011 census, the village has a population of 533 inhabitants.

Population

Gallery

References

Populated places in Jablanica District